Seventh Rum of a Seventh Rum is the seventh studio album by Scottish heavy metal band Alestorm. It was released on 24 June 2022 via Napalm Records. The album title is a reference to Iron Maiden's 1988 album Seventh Son of a Seventh Son. The album was produced by the band's long-time producer Lasse Lammert. It was preceded by four singles: "Magellan's Expedition", "P.A.R.T.Y.", "The Battle of Cape Fear River", and "Seventh Rum of a Seventh Rum".

Recording
The album was recorded with the band's long-time producer Lasse Lammert at Middle Farm Studios in Devon, England. Seventh Rum of a Seventh Rum features some of the same guest musicians from the band's previous album, Curse of the Crystal Coconut.

According to lead vocalist Christopher Bowes:

Composition
Seventh Rum of a Seventh Rum has been described as pirate metal, power metal, folk metal, and symphonic metal. According to Dom Lawson of Blabbermouth.net, the song "Come to Brazil" is a "snotty, punk-metal two-minuter," and "Cannonball" is obscenity-filled where as "Wooden Leg (Part III)" "is as sweetly melancholy as it is preposterous." The song "Under Blackened Banners" starts off with an electronic introduction.

Release

On 16 January 2022, the band announced that they started recording for their seventh studio album, Seventh Rum of a Seventh Rum. On 31 January 2022, the band released a music video for the song "Zombies Ate My Pirate Ship", a song from their sixth album, "Curse of the Crystal Coconut". On 13 March 2022, the band announced that their seventh studio album will be released on 24 June 2022. On 6 April 2022, the band released the lead single, "Magellan's Expedition". On 4 May 2022, the band released the second single, "P.A.R.T.Y.". On 1 June 2022, the band released the third single, "The Battle of Cape Fear River". On 22 June 2022, the band released the fourth single, "Seventh Rum of a Seventh Rum". The album was released on 24 June 2022.

Reception

According to Dom Lawson of Blabbermouth.net, "Seventh Rum of a Seventh Rum delivers plenty of the glories expected, with stupidity and sophistication playing equal roles throughout. Drink up, the party's starting again." In a negative review of the album, Dave Everley of Metal Hammer, stated that "Alestorm prove the joke is wearing thin for [their] seventh album..." and "their ‘I’m a pirate!’ shtick was once mildly amusing...but 15 years of cheeseball folk/power metal... and general yo-ho-ho-ing twattery have flogged any vestiges of entertainment out of it."

Track listing

Each song also has an Acoustic version and “For Dogs” version in the deluxe edition of the album. The Acoustic version was arranged by the band’s keyboardist, Elliot Vernon, and the “For Dogs” version has the vocals replaced by midi sampled dog barks.

Personnel
Alestorm
 Christopher Bowes – lead vocals, keytar
 Máté Bodor – guitars
 Gareth Murdock – bass
 Elliot Vernon – keyboard, unclean vocals
 Peter Alcorn – drums

Additional
 Captain Yarrface – vocals 
 Jamie Burton - backing vocals
 Matt Cockram - egg, backing vocals 
 Paul White - backing vocals 
 Ally Storch – violins
 Patty Gurdy – hurdy gurdy 
 Tobias Hain – trumpets
 Helge Tischler – trombones 
 Hellscore Choir – choir vocals

Production
 Lasse Lammert – production, mixing, mastering
 Jamie Burton - assistant egg engineer

Charts

References

2022 albums
Alestorm albums
Napalm Records albums